Poul Thomsen Vendelbo de Løvenørn, born Poul Thomsen (5 April 1686 – 27 February 1740) was a Danish military officer, diplomat and landowner. He served as Secretary of War and Minister of the Navy in the 1730s and was the owner of Bregentved Manor.

Early life and education
He was born at Horsens, the son of farmer Thomas Poulsen Vendelbo (or Windelboe) (died 1693) and wife Anne Nielsdatter (1645–1708). His father died in 1693 and the mother then married customs officer Stephan Jacobsen (1664–1728) in 1694. He studied theology.

Career
 
He then travelled to Russia where he initially worked as a teacher and later became adjutant general at the court of Peter the Great.

King Frederick IV raised him to the peerage under the surname Løvenørn on his return to Denmark in 1711. He was promoted through the ranks as a military officer and on 16 April 1722, was created Knight of the Order of the Dannebrog. He later served as Danish envoy om Berlin. In 1726, he was appointed to district governor (amtmand) of Aarhus County.

In 1733 he was appointed to general. He was a favorite of both King Frederick IV and King Christian VI. He was granted the Order of the Elephant in 1739.

Personal life
 
Løvenørn married Ingeborg Dorthea Vinding, (13 June 1686 – 28 January 1734) on 21 March 1714 in the Church of Our lady. She was a daughter of professor at the University of Copenhagen Poul Vinding (1658–1712) and Margrethe S. Bøgvad (1660–1721). His wife bore him a son, Frederik de Løvenørn (6 May 1715 – 15 October 1779) who became a military officer and district governor of Kronborg and Antvorskov.

Løvenørn purchased Bregentved Manor on very favorable conditions from the king in 1721. He died on 27 February 1740.

Cultural references
Ambrosius Stub (1705–1758) wrote the poem Om Poul Vendelbo Løvenørn (1740) about Løvenørn on the occasion of his death.

Carl Ploug (1813–1894) wrote a six-page romantic poem about Løvenørn's early years and first encounter with his wife. The poem, entitled A Kiss, is included on the anthology  (Copenhagen: Gyldendal, 1889).

References

External links

 Piul Vendelbo Løvenørn at geni.com
 Family tree
 Source about his time in Russian service
 Løvenørn's pistols in the National Museum of Denmark
 Source
 Løvenørn Ivory Goblet

1686 births
1740 deaths
Danish military officers
18th-century Danish diplomats
18th-century Danish landowners
People from Horsens
Løvenørn  family